102.1 The Edge may refer to the following radio stations:

 CFNY-FM (branded as 102.1 The Edge) in Toronto, Canada
 Edge FM 102.1 in Wangaratta, Victoria, Australia
 KDGE (branded as Star 102.1) in Dallas, Texas, U.S.

See also 
 The Edge (disambiguation)#Radio